Schmieder Bank is a rocky bank west of Point Sur, California, roughly  south of Monterey, supporting an extraordinarily lush biological community, including very large individual colonies of the California hydrocoral, Stylaster californicus.

The surface of the bank is a surf-erosional plateau, punctuated by a series of narrow ridges (running approximately parallel to the major axis), and several extremely sharp isolated pinnacles. During significant ice ages the bank emerged as an offshore island.

The bank was first explored during 1988–1991 by divers in visits organized and led by Dr. Robert Schmieder of Cordell Expeditions. That work generated a general description of the bank that was summarized in a privately published report. Because of the exceptionally rich biological community, the boundary of the Monterey Bay National Marine Sanctuary was extended to include the Point Sur area. The bank is similar in many respects to Cordell Bank, lying  to the northwest. The bank has become a desirable, but difficult, goal for scuba divers. Schmieder has characterized both this bank and Cordell Bank as examples of "underwater islands".

During 1986, NOAA carried out a high-resolution multibeam survey of the area as part of the Exclusive Economic Zone program.  In 1998, the Monterey Bay Aquarium Research Institute was contracted to carry out a high-resolution (5-meter horizontal) survey of the area.

Schmieder Bank was named on October 15, 1990 by the United States Board on Geographic Names.

References

Sources
 
 
 
 
 
 
 
  
 
 

Islands of Monterey County, California
Islands of California
Seamounts of the Pacific Ocean
Islands of Northern California
Undersea banks of the Pacific Ocean
Former islands from the last glacial maximum
Former islands of the United States
Pacific islands of California